Tom Farrell (born 23 March 1991) is an English long-distance runner. He represented his country at the 2015 World Championships in Athletics and 2016 IAAF World Indoor Championships. Both his parents are former athletes. His father David was a steeplechaser and his mother Jennifer Little was a high jumper.

Competition record

Personal bests
Outdoor
1500 metres – 3:37.90 (Glasgow 2014)
5000 metres – 13:10.48 (Heusden-Zolder 2015)
Indoor
1500 metres – 3:42.19 (Glasgow 2016)
One mile – 3:58.20 (Fayetteville 2013)
3000 metres – 7:42.47 (Portland 2016)
5000 metres – 13:42.17 (New York 2015)

References

External links
 
 
 
 
 
 
 
 

1991 births
Living people
Sportspeople from Carlisle, Cumbria
British male long-distance runners
English male long-distance runners
Olympic male long-distance runners
Olympic athletes of Great Britain
Athletes (track and field) at the 2016 Summer Olympics
Commonwealth Games competitors for England
Athletes (track and field) at the 2014 Commonwealth Games
World Athletics Championships athletes for Great Britain
British Athletics Championships winners